Danzey Green, sometimes known locally as simply Danzey, is a small rural hamlet in Warwickshire, England. It is within the civil parish of Tanworth-in-Arden, the village of which is around one mile to the north-west. Just east of Danzey is the River Alne.

It is served by Danzey railway station on the adjacent North Warwickshire Line.

Danzey Green was once home to a windmill, which was built in 1830, but it stopped working in 1874 after being damaged in a severe storm. In 1969 the windmill was dismantled and then reassembled at the Avoncroft Museum of Historic Buildings in nearby Worcestershire and restored to working order.

References

Hamlets in Warwickshire
Tanworth-in-Arden